Sir Thomas Wright (died 7 April 1798) was Sheriff of the City of London in 1779 and Lord Mayor of London in 1785.

References 

People from Dulwich
1798 deaths
Year of birth unknown
Stationers of the United Kingdom
18th-century lord mayors of London
18th-century English politicians
Sheriffs of the City of London